"Green River" is a song by American rock band Creedence Clearwater Revival. It was written by John Fogerty and released as a single in July 1969, one month before the album of the same name was released. "Green River" peaked at number two for one week, behind "Sugar, Sugar" by The Archies, and was ranked by Billboard as the No. 31 song of 1969.

Background 
The song was based on a childhood vacation spot of John Fogerty's. In an interview Fogerty gave to Rolling Stone in 2012, Fogerty stated:

Fogerty added that the "actual specific reference, 'Green River,' I got from a soda pop-syrup label... My flavor was called Green River."

Although the song seems to be mostly about idyllic memories, in the last verse a character named Old Cody Junior warns the singer that he's going to find the world smoldering but can always come back to Green River.  The name Old Cody Junior was a reference to the fact that Buffalo Bill Cody had owned the cabin by the creek that inspired the song.

As to the music, Fogerty said that:

Reception 
Billboard described the single as "a driving rocker in the same vein as" Creedence Clearwater Revival's previous single "Bad Moon Rising."  Cash Box described it as developing "the bayou-rock style of the CCR in a slower than 'Bad Moon Rising' track that could steal the spotlight."  Cash Box ranked it as the No. 19 single of 1969.  Ultimate Classic Rock critic Cliff M. Junior rated "Green River" as Creedence Clearwater Revival's 7th greatest song.

Sales and airplay 
"Green River" was certified gold (500,000 units sold) by the Recording Industry Association of America on December 13, 1990.

Cover versions 
Mary Wilson of The Supremes worked with UK record producer Gus Dudgeon on a cover version in the early 1980s. It was released in 2021 on Mary Wilson: The Motown Anthology. Country band Alabama recorded a cover version of the song that appears on their 1982 album Mountain Music. The Minutemen included a live performance cover of the song on their 1984 EP Tour-Spiel. Bill Wyman's Rhythm Kings covered it on their first album, Struttin' Our Stuff. The Hollies based their swamp rock pastiche "Long Cool Woman in a Black Dress" off the basic structure of "Green River"; The similarities between the two songs prompted John Fogerty to file suit against the band, alleging plagiarism. The case was settled out of court with Fogerty receiving half of the revenue from the song.
Eilen Jewell realesed a version of the song on a single in 2020.

Appearances in other media 
As a playable song for the Rock Band series of music video games as downloadable content.
In the trailer for the film Taking Woodstock.
In the video game Grand Theft Auto: San Andreas on the classic rock radio station K-DST.
During the lawnmower race in the television series King of the Hill, the episode being titled "Hank's Back Story"
In the video game Mafia III on the in-game radio.
In the first scene of the 2017 film The Post, directed by Steven Spielberg with performers Meryl Streep and Tom Hanks, with it being noted that the scene during the Vietnam War that the song accompanied was dated 1966 (meaning Spielberg made anachronistic use of the song three years before its actual release)

See also 

1969 in music
Creedence Clearwater Revival discography
Roots rock

References 

1969 singles
Creedence Clearwater Revival songs
Songs written by John Fogerty
Song recordings produced by John Fogerty
Fantasy Records singles
1969 songs
Songs about rivers